Ermin Huseinbašić (born 11 July 1993) is a Bosnian professional footballer who plays as a forward.

Club career
Born in Gradačac, Huseinbašić started his career at the lower-tier Bosna Mionica, before moving, aged 12, to the bigger Zvijezda Gradačac. As the U17 team and league top scorer, he got his chance to debut, aged 16, in the Bosnian Premier League.

In the summer of 2010, however, he moved to second-tier club Gradina, becoming a regular in the first team. His performance in the first half of the 2011–12 season, becoming the top scorer at the halfway point with 11 goals from the first 15 rounds, he went on trial with the Belgian side Gent. Having satisfied the coaches and having passed the medical exam, Huseinbašić nevertheless failed the fitness exam and wasn't signed.

Gradina qualified for the Bosnian Premier League, however, and after the first half of the season there, he moved to Sarajevo, the team he, according to his words, rooted for. After a year at Sarajevo, Huseinbašić rescinded his contract and moved to Sloboda Tuzla and, the following summer, joined Croatian 1. HNL team Istra 1961, making his debut on 28 July 2014, in a 1–1 away draw against Split.

After Istra, Huseinbašić also played for Bratstvo Gračanica in 2016 and for Zvijezda Gradačac in 2017, before joining Zvijezda 09 on 27 June 2017. With Zvijezda, he won the First League of RS in the 2017–18 season and got promoted to the Bosnian Premier League. On 27 May 2019, after his contract with Zvijezda 09 expired, Huseinbašić left the club. Only hours after leaving the club, he was named the Zvijezda 09 player of the 2018–19 season by the club supporters.

On 2 June 2019, Huseinbašić signed a two year contract with Čelik Zenica. He made his debut and scored his first goal for Čelik on 22 July 2019, in a 0–1 away league win against Široki Brijeg. Huseinbašić left Čelik on 16 June 2020 after terminating his contract with the club.

On 23 July 2020, he joined Radnik Bijeljna. Huseinbašić made his official debut for Radnik in a league game against his former team Sloboda Tuzla on 1 August 2020. He left Radnik in June 2021.

Honours
Zvijezda 09
First League of RS: 2017–18

Individual
Awards
Zvijezda 09 Player of the Season by supporters: 2018–19

References

External links
 
Ermin Huseinbašić profile at Sportnet.hr 

1993 births
Living people
People from Gradačac
Association football forwards
Bosnia and Herzegovina footballers
NK Zvijezda Gradačac players
OFK Gradina players
FK Sarajevo players
FK Sloboda Tuzla players
NK Istra 1961 players
NK Bratstvo Gračanica players
FK Zvijezda 09 players
NK Čelik Zenica players
FK Radnik Bijeljina players
NK Marsonia players
Premier League of Bosnia and Herzegovina players
Croatian Football League players
First League of the Federation of Bosnia and Herzegovina
First League of the Republika Srpska players
Second Football League (Croatia) players
Bosnia and Herzegovina expatriate footballers
Expatriate footballers in Croatia
Bosnia and Herzegovina expatriate sportspeople in Croatia